Nathaniel Page, may refer to:

 The Nathaniel Page House is an historic colonial house  in Bedford, Massachusetts. 

 Nathaniel ("Nat") Page  American former track and field athlete.